Cutthroat Lake is a lake in the Uinta Mountains in south‑central Summit County, Utah, United States.

The lake is located within the Uinta-Wasatch-Cache National Forest and was so named on account of the lake being stocked with cutthroat trout.

See also

 List of lakes in Utah

References

Lakes of Utah
Lakes of Summit County, Utah